The 1953–54 season was the 61st season in Liverpool F.C.'s existence, and would be their last season in the First Division for eight years after they finished bottom of the table. This relegation broke a streak of forty-nine consecutive seasons in the top flight. It remains the last time that Liverpool have been relegated from the top division.

Goalkeepers

 Charlie Ashcroft
 Russell Crossley
 Dave Underwood

Defenders

 Don Campbell
 Albert Childs
 Laurie Hughes
 Brian Jackson
 Bill Jones
 Ray Lambert
 Frank Lock
 Ronnie Moran
 Tom McNulty
 Bob Paisley
 Eddie Spicer
 Phil Taylor
 Fred Tomley
 Geoff Twentyman

Midfielders

 Alan A'Court
 Brian Jackson
 Billy Liddell
 Joseph Maloney
 Jimmy Payne
 Roy Saunders
 Jack Smith
 Barry Wilkinson

Forwards

 Eric Anderson
 Alan Arnell
 Kevin Baron
 Louis Bimpson
 John Evans
 Harold Jones
 Arthur Rowley
 Tony Rowley
 Sammy Smyth

Table

Results

First Division

FA Cup

References
 LFC History.net – 1953-54 season
 Liverweb - 1953-54 Season

Liverpool F.C. seasons
Liverpool